The Christmas Setup is an American-Canadian romantic comedy television film, directed by Pat Mills and broadcast in 2020. The first LGBTQ-themed Christmas film ever broadcast by Lifetime, the film stars Ben Lewis as Hugo, an uptight New York City attorney who comes home with his best friend Madelyn (Ellen Wong) to visit his mother Kate (Fran Drescher) for Christmas, and is forced to consider what he really wants in life when he reconnects with his high school crush Patrick (Blake Lee) just as he is offered a promotion to his firm's office in London.

Plot
Lawyer Hugo Spencer returns home to Milwaukee with best friend Madelyn McKay over Christmas. His mother, Kate Spencer, immediately sets up a list of chores and Christmas activities for her sons, Hugo and Aiden, who returns later that week. While there, Hugo runs into Patrick Ryan, a boy he crushed on in high school. Kate sets Hugo and Patrick, trying to match them up, much to Hugo's embarrassment. Hugo finds out the neighborhood's landmark train station will soon be demolished and rushes to save it. Hugo and Patrick connect and finally have their first kiss under the northern lights.

Hugo receives a call from his boss regarding the senior partner position he had been hoping for. His boss gives him the promotion, on the condition that he relocates to London to open their new office. Hugo takes the opportunity into consideration, distressed by the idea of leaving his home country, family, and Patrick. While at family Christmas trivia game night, Madelyn accidentally tells everyone about Hugo's new job, forcing Hugo to seriously reconsider his decision. Aiden and Maddy become a couple while Hugo finds the paperwork needed to save the train station. At the train station's party, Hugo decides to decline the job and begin a long distance relationship with Patrick.

The movie ends with Kate filming Hugo and Patrick as they kiss outside the train station.

Cast 
 Ben Lewis as Hugo Spencer
 Blake Lee as Patrick Ryan
 Ellen Wong as Madelyn McKay
 Fran Drescher as Kate Spencer
 Chad Connell as Aiden Spencer
 Pedro Miguel Arce as Cousin Jimmy Spencer
 Peter Nelson as Frank Ryan
 Glen Grant as George Vogel
 Lucinda Miu as Gladys Klaus

Production
The film was shot in Ottawa and Almonte, Ontario, in 2020.

Release
The film premiered December 12, 2020 on Lifetime in the United States, and December 18, 2020 on CTV Drama Channel in Canada.

Critical reception 
The Christmas Setup received positive reviews from critics upon its release. Patrick Serrano of O, The Oprah Magazine wrote "I've watched every made-for-TV movie in 2020. This is the most triumphant."<ref>Patrick Serrano, "https://www.oprahmag.com/entertainment/a34935804/lifetime-christmas-setup-lgtbq-christmas-movie-review/". O, The Oprah Magazine’’, December 11, 2020.</ref> Glamour magazine gave it a positive review with the headline "The Lifetime Gay Christmas Movie Totally Broke Me—So, Yup, It Worked", writing, "exhilarating, freeing, and—if you're a gay man—totally soul-crushing. Isn't that what rom-coms are supposed to do?" In a collective review of 2020's crop of LGBTQ-themed Christmas movies, Salon gave the film a mixed review, calling it cheesy and "derivative of probably 80 straight-to-television holiday movies", but called it "Salon's pick for just straight-up, saccharine Christmas fun. It hits all the marks that have become standard in the straight-to-television holiday movie genre" and praised the casting of real-life couple Lewis and Lee as the romantic leads and expressing relief that "at least none of the issues arise from the central couple". TVLine listed Fran Drescher as an honourable mention in their Performer of the Week, stating, "The most groundbreaking aspect of Lifetime’s first LGBTQ-themed holiday movie The Christmas Setup was not that it had a gay couple at its center. It was that it was actually really good" and "Drescher layered her alter ego’s unabashed glee with notes of genuine happiness. In a sea of indistinguishable, cookie-cutter holiday movie matriarchs, Drescher gifted us with a true Christmas miracle: an actual human being".

 Accolades The Christmas Setup'' was nominated for the 2021 GLAAD Media Award for Outstanding TV Movie.

The film received two Canadian Screen Award nominations at the 10th Canadian Screen Awards in 2022, for Best TV Movie and Best Lead Actor in a Television Film or Miniseries (Lewis).

References

External links

2020 films
2020 LGBT-related films
2020 television films
American comedy television films
American romantic comedy films
American LGBT-related television films
American Christmas comedy films
Canadian romantic comedy films
Canadian LGBT-related television films
Canadian Christmas comedy films
English-language Canadian films
Christmas television films
LGBT-related romantic comedy films
Lifetime (TV network) films
Films shot in Ottawa
Films directed by Pat Mills
Gay-related films
Canadian comedy television films
2020s Canadian films
2020s American films